Anthony Thomas (born 12 July 1971) is an English former professional footballer who played as a defender in the Football League for Tranmere Rovers, where he spent the majority of his career, in the Premier League for Everton and in the Scottish Premier League for Motherwell.

Career
Thomas was born in Liverpool. He began his career as a junior with Tranmere Rovers reserves, and quickly advanced through the ranks. He made his debut as a 17-year-old in the 1987–88 season and made more than 300 appearances in the next ten years. At Tranmere he was part of the side that won the 1989-90 Football League Trophy. After completing a £400,000 move to Everton before the 1997–98 season, injury disrupted his progress and he failed to hold down a first-team place.

He was sold to Motherwell at the beginning of the next season for £150,000, and scored his first and only goal for the club in a 3-1 Scottish Cup win over Hearts in January 1999. He retired from professional football due to injury in 2001.

References

External links
 

1971 births
Living people
Footballers from Liverpool
English footballers
Association football defenders
Tranmere Rovers F.C. players
Everton F.C. players
Motherwell F.C. players
English Football League players
Premier League players
Scottish Premier League players